Kipi, KIPI may refer to:

 KDE Image Plugin Interface
 Kipi, Estonia
 Kipoi, Ioannina
 Kenya Industrial Property Institute
 Korea Institute of Patent Information
 Kipi Ben Kipod
 Kipi (cosplayer)
 Samuel Kipi
 KIPI (FM), a radio station (93.5 FM) licensed to serve Eagle Butte, South Dakota, United States